Spider-Man is a superhero animated television series that was the first television series based on the Spider-Man comic book series created by writer Stan Lee and by artist Steve Ditko. It was jointly produced in Canada (voice acting) and the United States (animation). The show starred Paul Soles as the voice of Peter Parker, also known as Spider-Man. The first two seasons aired on the ABC television network, and the third was distributed in syndication. Grantray-Lawrence Animation produced the first season, and seasons two and three were produced by Krantz Films in New York City. The series aired Saturday mornings from September 9, 1967, to June 14, 1970.

The series is also remembered for its theme song containing the iconic "Spider-Man, Spider-Man, does whatever a spider can".

Synopsis
The series revolved around teenager Peter Parker, a high school student who develops extraordinary strength and spider-like powers after being bitten by a radioactive spider. Parker decides to become a crime-fighting, costumed superhero, but must deal with family tragedies, personal problems and the insecurity of youth. As Spider-Man, Parker risks his life to fight super-powered criminals such as Doctor Octopus, Mysterio and the Green Goblin. Peter is also a freelance photographer for the Daily Bugle, but editor J. Jonah Jameson considers Spider-Man a criminal and writes front-page headlines critical of his activities.

The first season dealt primarily with Peter's job at the Daily Bugle, focusing on his relationship with Jameson, his romance with receptionist Betty Brant, and often being called into action as his alter ego. Peter's life, apart from the Bugle office and his Aunt May's Forest Hills home, was rarely dealt with in early episodes. Although he was never seen at college, he would sometimes visit professors he knew (such as the opening of "Sub-Zero for Spidey", when he went to see Doctor Smartyr). Peter's character (blue suit, yellow vest, white shirt and red tie) was designed by Steve Ditko and art consultant John Romita Sr.

Season one's stories mainly involved classic Spider-Man villains from the comic-book series, whose captures were often accompanied by a note signed by "your friendly neighborhood Spider-Man". Stan Lee was the story consultant for this season. Seasons two and three, produced by Ralph Bakshi, almost entirely eliminated villains from the comic book as a cost-cutting measure in favor of generic, green-skinned, magical monsters; this enabled the reuse of stock footage from Rocket Robin Hood, another animated series produced by Bakshi.

Episodes

Cast

Regular (credited) voice providers
 Paul Soles – Peter Parker / Spider-Man, Ox, Fakir (in "The Fantastic Fakir"), Vulture (in "The Vulture's Prey"; "To Catch a Spider"; "The Winged Thing")
 Bernard Cowan – Narrator, Cowboy, Desperado (in "Blueprint for Crime"), Dr. Matto Magneto (in "The Revenge of Dr. Magneto"), Dr. Von Schlick (in "The Slippery Dr. Von Schlick"), Plutonian Leader (in "Sub-Zero for Spidey")
 Paul Kligman – J. Jonah Jameson, Fiddler/Otto (in "Fiddler on the Loose"), Hippie Poet (in "Blueprint for Crime") Lee Patterson (in "The Spider and the Fly")
 Peg Dixon – Betty Brant, Mrs. Connors, May Parker

Semi-regular (uncredited) voice providers

 Carl Banas – Scorpion, Charles Cameo (in "Double Identity"), Dr. Manta (in "Phantom from the Depths of Time"), Kotep (in "The Evil Sorcerer")
 Len Carlson – Green Goblin, Captain Ned Stacy, Parafino (in "The Peril of Parafino"; "Night of the Villains"), Bolton (in "Thunder Rumble"), Stan Patterson (in "Trick or Treachery")
 Vern Chapman – Doctor Octopus (in "The Power of Dr. Octopus")
 Gillie Fenwick – Lizard Man/Dr. Curtis Conners, Vulture (in "The Sky is Falling"), Doctor Smartyr, Pardo (in "Pardo Presents"), Plotter (in "Blueprint for Crime")
 Max Ferguson – Fifth Avenue Phantom, The Executioner of Paris (in "Night of the Villains")
 Tom Harvey – Electro, Doctor Octopus (in "The Terrible Triumph of Doctor Octopus"), Farley Stillwell, Kingpin, Sandman (in "Sands of Crime"), Baron von Rantenraven (in "Sky Harbor"), Director (in "The Menace of Mysterio"), Dr. Atlantean (in "Up From Nowhere"), Master Vine (in "Vine"), Mugs Riley (in "Menace from the Bottom of the World" and "Spider-Man Battles the Molemen"), Clive (in "Blotto")
 Jack Mather – Jesse James (in "Night of the Villains")
 Ed McNamara – Rhino, Blackbeard (in "Night of the Villains"), Vulcan (in "Here Comes Trubble")
 Frank Perry – Captain (in "Return of the Flying Dutchman"), James Boothe (in "Farewell Performance")
 Henry Ramer – Henry Smythe, Dr. Noah Boddy, Grandini the Mystic (in "The Witching Hour"), Lee Patterson (in "Trick or Treachery"), Mr. Flintridge (in "The Spider and the Fly")
 Claude Ray – Charles Cameo (in "The Sinister Prime Minister")
 Billie Mae Richards – Billy Connors
 Alfie Scopp – Jewelry Store Clerk (in "The Dark Terrors"), Fifth Avenue Phantom (in "The Dark Terrors"), Stan Patterson (in "The Spider and the Fly")
 Chris Wiggins – Mysterio, Blackwell the Magician, Harley Clivendon, Boomer (in "Thunder Rumble"), Infinata (in "Revolt in the Fifth Dimension")
 J. Frank Willis – Cyrus Flintridge III

Production

Budget
Because of the show's limited budget, Spider-Man's costume only has webbed areas on his head, arms and boots; the rest is plain, except for the spiders on his chest and back. The series relied on reused stock animation, including Spider-Man swinging across the New York City skyline and Peter stripping off his white dress shirt to reveal his spider suit. Character movement was also minimized.

The second and third seasons were produced on a reduced budget by Krantz Films under Ralph Bakshi. The cost-cutting is most apparent in the third season, with two episodes reusing almost all the footage from two Rocket Robin Hood episodes (notably the season-three Rocket Robin Hood episode, "Dementia 5") and remaking previous episodes with minimal changes.

Several stories during this time were written by noted science fiction/fantasy author Lin Carter.

An error in Spider-Man's costume appeared throughout season one, with the spider on his costume having only six legs. By season two, new drawings of the costume showed an eight-legged spider, but reused footage from season one continued that season's error.

The second- and third-season episodes had a darker tone, with dark-colored settings, psychedelic images and atmospheric music. Bakshi explored Peter's everyday life as a soft-spoken college student, such as his failure to make the football team in "Criminals in the Clouds" and becoming a star pitcher for the baseball team in "Diamond Dust". He dated a variety of women who were either concealing secrets ("Home") or waited angrily for him while Spider-Man saved the city from destruction ("Swing City"). Peter's most consistent love interest was Susan Shaw, who first appeared in "Criminals in the Clouds" and continued to appear in season-two and -three episodes, even though her appearance changed from episode to episode. Bakshi provided the first origin story for Spider-Man presented on television, "The Origin of Spider-Man", which actually used chunks of Stan Lee's dialogue from The Spectacular Spider-Man #1 - specifically, "In the Beginning", published in July 1968, a few months before the episode aired.

Rocket Robin Hood footage
"Phantom from the Depths of Time" and "Revolt in the Fifth Dimension" were largely recycled animation from two episodes ("From Menace to Menace" and "Dementia Five") of the earlier series Rocket Robin Hood, with Spider-Man substituted for Rocket Robin Hood on the animation cels.

Theme song

The show's theme song has become a popular standard. Its lyrics were written by Academy Award winner Paul Francis Webster, with music composed by Bob Harris.

The catchy song is recognized by its opening line, "Spider-Man, Spider-Man, does whatever a spider can".

The 2002 and 2004 film versions included Jayce Bartok and Elyse Dinh, respectively, busking the song. Both films have the song at the end of the credits; the 2002 adaptation featured the original 1967 recording, and 2004's Spider-Man 2 features a re-recording by Michael Bublé. 2007's Spider-Man 3 features a performance of the song by a marching band at a public rally for Spider-Man. In 2014's The Amazing Spider-Man 2, Peter uses a version of the theme as his ringtone. In 2017's Spider-Man: Homecoming, an orchestral version plays over the Marvel Studios title card sequence. In 2018's Spider-Man: Into the Spider-Verse, the theme is briefly played at the beginning, when the original Peter Parker says he "had a catchy theme song".

The original Spider-Man theme song recording was remixed by UK-based electronic music group Apollo 440 as the theme song for the 2000 Spider-Man video game by Activision and Neversoft Entertainment.

The show's incidental music uses jangling surf guitar, brass lines and jazzy scoring. The first season's score was original by Ray Ellis, with season two and three utilizing other music from the KPM, Capitol, Conroy and Josef Weinberger libraries by Syd Dale, Alan Hawkshaw, Johnny Hawksworth and David Lindup. In 2002, the Winnipeg jazz rock band Volume released a CD, The Amazing Spider-Band, adapting the background music.  MIDI musician Vaughn Smith (Moxxi) has also released some adaptations to YouTube and elsewhere.  In 2007, the radio station WFMU did a radio show featuring songs from the cartoon alongside the original masters from KPM, later released as a podcast.

Broadcast schedule
Spider-Man was initially transmitted in the United States on Saturday mornings on ABC. The first episode, "The Power Of Doctor Octopus"/"Sub-Zero For Spidey", premiered on September 9, 1967. During the first and second seasons, the show was broadcast at 10 a.m. Eastern Time. ABC's last Saturday-morning broadcast of Spider-Man was on August 30, 1969, with 39 half-hour episodes (many with two stories) aired. The show went on hiatus until the following March, when a third season began a six-month run from March 22 to September 6, 1970, on Sunday mornings at 11:30 a.m. Eastern. It was rerun in syndication in the United States during the 1970s, usually as part of local stations' after-school cartoon block. In Canada, the series aired on CTV Network affiliates on Saturday morning and other time slots during the 1970s and 1980s.

In Japan, the series was broadcast on TV Tokyo from July 23, 1974, to August 30, 1974, with an episode also aired on October 10, 1974 (episode title unknown). It was broadcast again from November 30, 1974, to March 29, 1975. Kei Tomiyama was in charge of the Japanese version voice actor. In June 1986 it was broadcast on TV Tokyo again and ended in November of the same year. The voice actor was changed to Hideyuki Tanaka.

In 1977, Spider-Man was broadcast abroad, airing in several international markets for the first time. The Spanish and Italian versions used a different theme song, written by Erick Bulling and Santiago and sung by Chilean singer Guillermo "Memo" Aguirre, dubbed over the original introduction. In the Italian version, the show's title (L'uomo Ragno) was superimposed in large yellow type over the first two shots of Spider-Man swinging through the city.

The series aired on ABC Family in 2002 as part of the network's Memorial Day weekend-long "Spidey-Mania" marathon, to coincide with the release of the first Spider-Man movie. It was not seen again until another "Spidey-Mania" marathon in 2004, coinciding with the release of Spider-Man 2, its last television appearance in the U.S.

In September 2008, the series appeared in Canada on Teletoon Retro. A French-language dub aired on Radio-Canada's Saturday-morning lineup into the mid-2000s. Episodes of the series have been posted in the "Videos" section of the Marvel website, but have since been removed.

Home video releases
A number of episodes were released on VHS during the 1980s, 1990s and the early 2000s, usually compiled with other Marvel Comics characters' cartoons. The early-2000s releases were included as bonus episodes with the 1990s animated series. The episodes on The Ultimate Villain Showdown and The Return Of The Green Goblin were mastered from pre-2004 tapes, and the remaining tapes, Spider-Man vs. Doc Ock and Daredevil Meets Spider-Man, used the 2004 remastered versions.

In 2008 and 2009, Morningstar Entertainment released a number of episodes on DVD in Canada. These were reissues (mastered from VHS and Betamax copies) of the 1985 Prism Video Marvel Video Library. Compared to the early 2000s DVDs by Disney, the video and audio quality on the Morningstar are poor.

On June 29, 2004, Buena Vista Home Entertainment (whose parent company would acquire Marvel five years later) released the complete series on DVD in Region 1 as Spider-Man – The '67 Collection. The six-disc box set, with all 52 unedited, uncut original episodes of the TV series and an introduction by creator Stan Lee, was discontinued after a few years. Pre-owned copies go for high prices online today and there are currently no plans for Marvel and Disney to re-release the set.

In April 2008, Liberation Entertainment secured the home media rights to select Marvel shows from Jetix Europe in select European territories. On November 10, 2008, the company released the first season of the series as Spider-Man: The Original '67 Series on DVD. Another UK company, Clear Vision, later acquired the Region 2 rights.

In popular culture
During the "Spider-Verse" storyline, a variation of the TV show's universe appears with the designation of Earth-67. The Spider-Army recruit the Spider-Man of Earth-67 in order to help fight the Inheritors.

In Spider-Man: Into the Spider-Verse, Miguel O'Hara / Spider-Man 2099 (voiced by Oscar Isaac) develops a device allowing inter-dimensional travel and goes to the "beginning" with the universe also being designated as "Earth-67" where 2099 encounters the local Spider-Man (voiced by Jorma Taccone with the character being credited as "Last Dude") with footage from "Double Identity" being used. The scene is a nod to a popular internet meme based on a scene from "Double Identity" featuring two Spider-Men pointing at each other. The same meme was parodied in Spider-Man: No Way Home twice: first, for a scene where Ned Leeds tries to speak to his Peter Parker, only for all three to confusedly respond; the second time for a scene where they are trying to figure out which Peter is which for purposes of combat strategy. According to Andrew Garfield, the latter instance occurred naturally during filming, but the first instance was done at his suggestion after the production team was trying to figure out how to reference the meme.

The 2021 animated short DC Showcase: Blue Beetle is created to be a tongue-in-cheek homage to the Spider-Man series, playfully imagining what an animated series featuring Steve Ditko's Charlton Comics characters could have been like during the same era of television animation.

References

External links

 

1960s American animated television series
1970s American animated television series
1967 American television series debuts
1970 American television series endings
1960s Canadian animated television series
1970s Canadian animated television series
1967 Canadian television series debuts
1970 Canadian television series endings
American Broadcasting Company original programming
American children's animated superhero television series
American children's animated adventure television series
American children's animated action television series
Animated Spider-Man television series
Animated television series based on Marvel Comics
Canadian children's animated superhero television series
Canadian children's animated adventure television series
Canadian children's animated action television series
Film and television memes
Teen animated television series
Teen superhero television series
Television shows based on Marvel Comics
Television shows set in New York City
Television series by Grantray-Lawrence Animation
Works by Ralph Bakshi